"You for Me" is a song by British DJ Sigala and British singer Rita Ora. It was released on 2 July 2021 through Ministry of Sound and B1 Recordings.

Credits and personnel
 Sigala – composition, production
 Rita Ora – vocals, composition
 Alexander Cook – composition
 Charlotte Emma Aitchison – composition
 Finn Keane – composition
 Joakim Jarl – composition
 Madison Love – composition
 Jarly – production
 Neave Applebaum – production
 Dave Kutch – master engineering
 Mark Ralph – mix engineering
 Liam Quinn – recording engineering, vocal engineering
 Dipesh Parmar – editing, performance arrangement
 Cameron Gower Poole – vocal production
 Milly McGregor – violin

Charts

Weekly charts

Year-end charts

Certifications

References

External links
 

 

2021 songs
2021 singles
Sigala songs
Rita Ora songs
Songs written by Rita Ora
Songs written by Charli XCX
Songs written by A. G. Cook
Songs written by Madison Love
Songs written by Sigala